The 2016 ICC World Cricket League Division Five was an international cricket tournament that took place in Jersey during May 2016. It formed part of the 2012–18 cycle of the World Cricket League (WCL). The Jersey Cricket Board were awarded the hosting rights in October 2015, with the Nigeria Cricket Federation the only other bidder.

The competition's final was played at the Grainville Cricket Ground in Saint Saviour, with Jersey defeating Oman by 44 runs. Both teams were promoted to the 2016 Division Four tournament.

Teams 
Six teams qualified for the tournament:
  (5th in 2014 ICC World Cricket League Division Four)
  (6th in 2014 ICC World Cricket League Division Four)
  (3rd in 2014 ICC World Cricket League Division Five)
  (4th in 2014 ICC World Cricket League Division Five)
 
  (2nd in 2015 ICC World Cricket League Division Six)
  (3rd in 2015 ICC World Cricket League Division Six, invited in March 2016 to replace Suriname)

In March 2016 Suriname withdrew from the tournament due to an ICC investigation about the eligibility of some of their players. At least six players had doubts raised regarding their eligibility, including the Division Six tournament's man of the series, Gavin Singh and the leading wicket-taker, Muneshwar Patandin. Vanuatu were named as their replacement.

Match officials 

Umpires
  Mark Hawthorne – Mentor umpire
  Alan Neill
  Alex Dowdalls
  Huub Jansen
  Issac Oyieko
  Jacqueline Williams
  Pim van Liemt
  Sue Redfern
  Tabarak Dar

Match referee
  David Jukes

For the fixture between Oman and Nigeria on 22 May, Sue Redfern was one of the standing umpires, while Jacqueline Williams was the third umpire. It was the first time two female umpires had officiated in a men's match in an ICC tournament.

Preparation 
Vanuatu played warm-up matches against Denmark and the Marylebone Cricket Club (MCC) in London. After continuing on to Jersey, the team also played a final warm-up match against Oman, before the start of the tournament proper. Guernsey played a series of warm-up matches in Sussex, England, including two against a Netherlands A side.

Squads

Points table

Fixtures

Round robin

Playoffs

5th-place playoff

3rd-place playoff

Final

Final placings
After the conclusion of the tournament the teams were distributed as follows:

Statistics

Most runs
The top five runscorers are included in this table, ranked by runs scored and then by batting average.

Source: ESPNcricinfo

Most wickets

The top five wicket takers are listed in this table, ranked by wickets taken and then by bowling average.

Source: ESPNcricinfo

References

External links 
 Series home at ESPN Cricinfo

2016, 5
2016 in cricket
International cricket competitions in Jersey
2016 in Jersey
International cricket competitions in 2016